Alpha 1 or Alpha-1 may refer to:
Alpha-1 adrenergic receptor, a G protein-coupled receptor
Alpha-1 antitrypsin, a protein
Alpha-1 antitrypsin deficiency, a genetic disorder 
Alpha-1-fetoprotein or Alpha-fetoprotein, a protein
Alpha-One, a fictional spacecraft in Buzz Lightyear of Star Command: The Adventure Begins
Alpha 1 (Robert Silverberg anthology), a 1970 book

See also

Alpha (disambiguation)
AMY1A or Alpha-1A or, an enzyme found in humans and other mammals
List of A1 genes, proteins or receptors